Peter Terence Richard Ferbrache (born 1951) is an elected Deputy in the States of Guernsey and president of the Policy and Resources Committee.

Early life and education 
Ferbrache was born in Guernsey where he was educated at Elizabeth College before going to a law school in England. He qualified as a barrister in England in 1972.

Career
He returned to Guernsey in 1980 and was called to the bar as an advocate in March 1981, later becoming senior partner of Mourant Ozannes. Alongside his political career he remains a consultant and notary public at Ferbrache & Farrell LLP.

He was first elected in 1994 as a deputy for the Castel district before being elected in 1997 as an island wide conseiller, becoming president of the Board of Industry between 1997 and 2000. He did not stand for re-election in 2000.

Returning to politics, Ferbrache was elected at the general election on 27 April 2016 as a deputy for the Saint Peter Port South district, then standing for, but not getting after two drawn votes, the position of Policy & Resources Committee president.

Voted as President of the States of Guernsey's Economic Development Committee he held the position until resigning in November 2017 as a result of accusations of a conflict of interest with a law firm that was provided with a government contract. In February 2018 he was cleared of any wrongdoing.

In November 2018 he became a founding member and chairman of The 2020 Association

Standing again, he was re-elected at the 2020 general election and then in a secret ballot of deputies on 16 October 2020 he beat the incumbent to become president of the Policy and Resources Committee.

Personal life
He is married with four children.

References

External links 

 

1951 births
Guernsey people
Living people
Members of the States of Guernsey
Presidents of the Policy and Resources Committee of Guernsey